Shyshaky is an urban-type settlement in Poltava Oblast in Ukraine. It was formerly the administrative center of Shyshaky Raion, but now administrated within Myrhorod Raion. It is located on the left bank of the Psel, a left tributary of the Dnieper. Population:

History
In ХІХ century Shyshaky was part of Shyshaky volost, Mirgorodsky Uyezd, Poltava Governorate.

Economy

Transportation
The settlement has access to Highway M03 connecting Kyiv and Kharkiv via Poltava. It also has access to Velyki Sorochyntsi and Myrhorod.

There is both local and long-distance passenger traffic.

References

Urban-type settlements in Myrhorod Raion
Mirgorodsky Uyezd